Gata de Gorgos is a village in the Marina Alta region of the north Costa Blanca in Spain. It has a population of 5,325 (2005).

The village is known for its wicker industry and for having an unusually large number of bars and restaurants per capita. Boasting over 30 bars, the most popular are Ca Corder, which is located in the church square, and Ca Patrics, which is located in the Placa Nuevo.

The town's key fiestas take place during July to honour The Christ of the Calvary.(Fiestas en honor al Santísimo Cristo del Calvario). A key part of this event includes bull running along the street known as Paseo de Alicante - another is when the town's young men and women who are 'coming of age' form groups called 'Quintos' and march through the town accompanied by music and watched by family and friends. The highlight to many is the Paella Night, where most of the town congregate in the school to cook paella in the open air before being entertained by a local band.

References

External links

 Web de l'Ajuntament de Gata
 The Official Valencian Government Portal for events in Gata de Gorgos 
 Institut Valencià d'Estadística.
 Portal de la Direcció General d'Administració Local de la Generalitat.
 Diari Parlem.
 El temps en Gata de Gorgos.

Towns in Spain
Marina Alta